Alberto Bressan (born 15 June 1956) is an Italian mathematician at Penn State University. His primary field of research is mathematical analysis including hyperbolic systems of conservation laws, impulsive control of Lagrangian systems, and non-cooperative differential games.

Contributions
Bressan has contributed several important results in the theory of hyperbolic conservation laws.
His early work was on certain mathematical problems from the theory of combustion. His research to date includes a number of key results in such diverse areas as: hyperbolic systems of conservation laws and nonlinear wave equations, impulsive control of Lagrangian system, systems of Hamilton–Jacobi equations (related to non-cooperative differential games), Nash equilibrium solutions in feedback form for infinite-horizon, discounted differential games, dynamic blocking problems (mathematical models of wild fire confinement), and optimization problems for elliptic equations.

Education and career
Bressan obtained his PhD in mathematics from University of Colorado under Jerrold Bebernes in 1982. Bressan received a full professorship at the SISSA in Trieste, Italy in 1991. In 2003, he moved to Penn State University to assume a full professorship there — a position he still holds.

Recognition
He won the Bôcher Memorial Prize in 2008 and the Analysis of Partial Differential Equations Prize of the SIAM in 2007 for his work in PDEs. He was appointed to the Eberly Family Chair in Mathematics at Penn State in August 2008.

In addition to the above, his honors include the A. Feltrinelli prize for Mathematics, Mechanics and Applications of the Accademia Nazionale dei Lincei in Rome. In 2012 he became a fellow of the American Mathematical Society.

Bressan was invited to give a plenary talk at the International Congress of Mathematicians at Beijing in August 2002.

References

External links 

 Bressan's CV

20th-century Italian mathematicians
21st-century Italian mathematicians
University of Colorado alumni
1956 births
Living people
Pennsylvania State University faculty
Fellows of the American Mathematical Society
Mathematicians from Philadelphia
Scientists from Venice